The Kengeede (Küŋgede), also spelled as Kengede, Kengyade or Kende, is a river in Yakutia (Sakha Republic) and Krasnoyarsk Krai, Russia.

The river basin is a lonely, desolate area devoid of settlements.

Course  
The Kengeede is a left tributary of the Arga-Sala. Its sources are in the southern end of the Anabar Plateau, south of the basin of the Bolshaya Kuonamka. The river flows roughly southwards , to the east of the Kyuyonelekeen. It heads across mountainous taiga areas with rapids and riffles in numerous sections. In its upper course it bends eastwards, then for a stretch northeastwards, and then again southwards, heading in that direction for the remainder of its course. Finally it joins the left bank of the Arga-Sala river  from its mouth, not far upstream of Olenyok village, Olenyoksky District, one of the few inhabited localities of the area. 

The river is frozen between the first half of October and late May or early June.

Tributaries 

See also
List of rivers of Russia

References

External links 
Fishing & Tourism in Yakutia
The Vendian System and Neoproterozoic-III Sokolov-1995

Rivers of the Sakha Republic
Tributaries of the Arga-Sala
Central Siberian Plateau